On 4 January 1999, a mass shooting was carried out at a Shia mosque in Karam Dad Qureshi, Punjab, Pakistan, killing 17 people.

Background

Sectarian attacks between majority Sunnis and minority Shias are common in Pakistan. In September 1996, 22 people were killed in a mass shooting at a Sunni mosque in Multan, Punjab.

Attack
At 6:25am on 4 January 1999, four men arrived by car at a Shia mosque in Karam Dad Qureshi, a village in Muzaffargarh Tehsil, Muzaffargarh District, in the Punjab province of Pakistan. As one stood by the entrance to the mosque and the driver stayed in the car, the other two entered the building, carrying guns, as worshippers were studying the Quran after morning prayers. They fired at the worshippers, killing 17 of them.

Reaction
No group claimed responsibility for the massacre. Several members of the hardline Sunni group, Sipah-e-Sahaba Pakistan, were arrested.

References

1999 mass shootings in Asia
1999 murders in Pakistan
20th century in Punjab, Pakistan
20th-century mass murder in Pakistan
Attacks on buildings and structures in 1999
Attacks on buildings and structures in Punjab, Pakistan
Attacks on mosques in Asia
Attacks on religious buildings and structures in Pakistan
January 1999 crimes
January 1999 events in Asia
Mass murder in 1999
Mass murder in Punjab, Pakistan
Mass shootings in Pakistan
Massacres in religious buildings and structures
Mosque shootings
Muzaffargarh District
Terrorist incidents in Pakistan in 1999
Terrorist incidents in Punjab, Pakistan